Frank Rodney Dethridge (born 13 September 1961) is a former English cricketer.  Dethridge was a right-handed batsman who bowled right-arm fast-medium.  He was born in Pembury, Kent.

Dethridge made his debut for Bedfordshire in the 1982 Minor Counties Championship against Hertfordshire.  Dethridge played Minor counties cricket for Bedfordshire until 1983, which included 11 Minor Counties Championship matches.  He made his only List A appearance against Somerset in the 1982 NatWest Trophy.  In this match, he scored 31 runs before being run out.  With the ball, he claimed a single wicket, that of Vic Marks, for the cost of 21 runs from 7 overs.  His performance in this match earned him the man-of-the-match award.

Dethridge also played for Durham University, where he took a degree in Zoology followed by a teaching certificate. He was part of the Kent Second XI (1982) in the Second XI Championship and later represented Berkshire (1985) and Free Foresters (1994–1998).

References

External links

1961 births
Living people
Alumni of Hatfield College, Durham
People from Pembury
English cricketers
Bedfordshire cricketers
Berkshire cricketers
Free Foresters cricketers